This is a list of electoral results for the Electoral district of Sunshine in Victorian state elections.

Sunshine was very safe Labor territory as the ALP has always won the seat with a primary vote.

In fact only on three occasions in 1967, 1992 and 1999 did the Labor primary vote fell below 60%.

Despite 1992 seeing the sitting Labor Government being swept away in a landslide, sitting member Ian Baker only suffered a minor swing against him on the two-party preferred basis.

In 1999, Baker was disendorsed by the ALP and ran unsuccessfully as an independent against the successful Labor candidate Telmo Languiller.

Baker as an independent won 14.2% of the vote and with Languiller winning 58.8% which equalled to more than 70% of the vote.

Members for Sunshine

Election results

Elections in the 1990s

Elections in the 1980s

Elections in the 1970s

Elections in the 1960s

Elections in the 1950s

Elections in the 1940s

References

Victoria (Australia) state electoral results by district